The Occupancy Permits Act was passed on March 4, 1915, by the 63rd United States Congress. It allowed the U.S. Forest Service to issue to cabin permits at "reasonable rates" to individuals who had had their property taken through eminent domain. Permits could be issued for periods of up to 30 years.  Individuals were encouraged to build homes within the boundaries of national parks in order to widen the Forest Services' work in recreational management.

Purpose

Rental rates were already low, but this measure was meant to give the federal government further insurance protection with the "Forest Register" which oversaw rates to allow lower rents by lengthening the amount of time contracted to residents.

It affected private cabins on lands that had, at some point, been designated public.  It established reasonable rental rates, with "reasonable" meaning rates that were not too low, allowing those who had lived on the land for years who had had their property taken through eminent domain to continue to reside there for their remaining years.

References

1915 in American law
United States federal legislation
63rd United States Congress